Irrationality is cognition, thinking, talking, or acting without inclusion of rationality. It is more specifically described as an action or opinion given through inadequate use of reason, or through emotional distress or cognitive deficiency. The term is used, usually pejoratively, to describe thinking and actions that are, or appear to be, less useful, or more illogical than other more rational alternatives.

Irrational behaviors of individuals include taking offense or becoming angry about a situation that has not yet occurred, expressing emotions exaggeratedly (such as crying hysterically), maintaining unrealistic expectations, engaging in irresponsible conduct such as problem intoxication, disorganization, and falling victim to confidence tricks. People with a mental illness like schizophrenia may exhibit irrational paranoia.

These more contemporary normative conceptions of what constitutes a manifestation of irrationality are difficult to demonstrate empirically because it is not clear by whose standards we are to judge the behavior rational or irrational.

Explanation of occurrence

The study of irrational behavior is of interest in fields such as psychology, cognitive science, economics, game theory, and evolutionary psychology, as well as of practical interest to the practitioners of advertising and propaganda.

Theories of irrational behavior include:
 People's actual interests differ from what they believe to be their interests.
 Mechanisms that have evolved to give optimal behavior in normal conditions lead to irrational behavior in abnormal conditions.
 Situations are outside of one's ordinary circumstances, where one may experience intense levels of fear, or may regress to a fight-or-flight mentality.
 People fail to realize the irrationality of their actions and believe they are acting perfectly rationally, possibly due to flaws in their reasoning.
 Apparently irrational decisions are actually optimal, but made unconsciously on the basis of "hidden" interests that are not known to the conscious mind.
 People have the inability to comprehend the social consequences of their own actions, possibly due in part to a lack of empathy.
 Some people find themselves in this condition by living "double" lives. They try to put on one "mask" for one group of people and another for a different group of people. Many will become confused as to which they really are or which they wish to become.

Factors that affect rational behavior include:
 Stress, which in turn may be emotional or physical
 The introduction of a new or unique situation
 Intoxication
 Peers who convey irrational thoughts as necessary standards for social acceptance.

Intentional
Irrationality is not always viewed as a negative. Dada Surrealist art movements embraced irrationality as a means to "reject reason and logic". André Breton, for example, argued for a rejection of pure logic and reason which are seen as responsible for many contemporary social problems.

In science fiction literature, the progress of pure rationality is viewed as a quality which may lead civilization ultimately toward a scientific future dependent on technology. Irrationality in this case, is a positive factor which helps to balance excessive reason.

In psychology, excessive rationality without creativity may be viewed as a form of self-control and protection. Certain problems, such as death and loss, may have no rational solution when they are being experienced. One may seek logical explanations for such events, when in fact the proper emotional response is grief. Irrationality is thus a means of freeing the mind toward purely imaginative solutions, to break out of historic patterns of dependence into new patterns that allow one to move on.

Irrationalist
Irrationalist is a wide term. It may be applied to mean "one without rationality", for their beliefs or ideas. Or, more precisely, it may mean someone who openly rejects some aspect of rationalism, variously defined.  It can be seen as either a negative quality, used pejoratively, or a positive quality: For example, religious faith may variably be seen by some as a virtue which doesn't need to be rational (see fideism), while others (even of the same religious tradition) may view their faiths as being rational, favoring rationalism.

Also, it might be considered irrationalist to gamble or buy a lottery ticket, on the basis that the expected value is negative.

Irrational thought was seen in Europe as part of the reaction against Continental rationalism. For example, Johann Georg Hamann is sometimes classified as an irrationalist.

In philosophy
Ancient Greek philosophy established a fundamental differentiation between logical "true" assumptions of the universe and irrational "false" statements or mere opinions based on emotion or sensorial experience. The German cultural historian Silvio Vietta has shown that Greek philosophy thus founded a dual cultural system based on rationality as the domain of philosophy and science versus "irrational" emotion and sensuality as domains of literature and art. Since the irrational emotions as stirred up in literature threaten the rationality of human beings, in The Republic Plato expelled poets from the state.

In the later history of philosophy this opposition of rationality and the irrational was renewed as a methodological differentiation by Descartes, but reversed by Pascal in his statement: "Le coeur a ses raisons, que la raison ne connait point" ("The heart has its reasons which reason does not know"). Pascal thus asserted a specific rationality of the "irrational" emotions. The philosophy of sensualism (John Locke, among others) underlined the importance of the senses as the source of human perception and cognition.

The 19th-century German philosopher Julius Bahnsen asserted that all thought processes, desires and actions ultimately led to irresolvable contradictions which stem from the inherent irrationality of being. Years earlier, Friedrich Wilhelm Joseph Schelling had theorized that despite some traces of rationality in the world, the "dark ground" of being itself rested in an irrational will that could not be explained, only described in an apophatic manner. Arthur Schopenhauer picked up on this idea and completely fleshed out the concept of an irrational will as a cause of existence, by founding his entire metaphysics and explaining the variety of physical phenomena precisely with this underlying, unconscious and dynamic notion of will.

Søren Kierkegaard gave some remit to irrationality in his Concluding Scientific Postscript to the Philosophical Fragments, where he claimed that 'Subjectivity is Truth'. Rather than allowing reason to do our choosing for us, Kierkegaard argued that irrational leaps of faith could be more useful, as they were more authentic (although, he never used the word 'authentic'), and thus gave more meaning to life. Objectivity, like reason, was opposed to subjectivity, and thus could not be said to give any meaning to anyone's life. Although he never dismissed rationality in its entirety, Kierkegaard argued that we could not allow rationality to make our decisions for us. In this, and to some degree, he offers a vindication of irrationality.

In literature
Much subject matter in literature can be seen as an expression of human longing for the irrational. The Romantics valued irrationality over what they perceived as the sterile, calculating and emotionless philosophy which they thought to have been brought about by the Age of Enlightenment and the Industrial Revolution.
The Dadaists and Surrealists later used irrationality as a basis for their art. The disregard of reason and preference for dream states in Surrealism was an exaltation of the irrational and the rejection of logic.

Mythology nearly always incorporates elements of fantasy and the supernatural; however myths are largely accepted by the societies that create them, and only come to be seen as irrational through the spyglass of time and by other cultures. But though mythology serves as a way to rationalize the universe in symbolic and often anthropomorphic ways, a pre-rational and irrational way of thinking can be seen as tacitly valued in mythology's supremacy of the imagination, where rationality as a philosophical method has not been developed.

On the other side the irrational is often depicted from a rational point of view in all types of literature, provoking amusement, contempt, disgust, hatred, awe, and many other reactions.

In psychotherapy 

The term irrational is often used in psychotherapy and the concept of irrationality is especially known in rational emotive behavior therapy originated and developed by American psychologist Albert Ellis. In this approach, the term irrational is used in a slightly different way than in general. Here irrationality is defined as the tendency and leaning that humans have to act, emote and think in ways that are inflexible, unrealistic, absolutist and most importantly self-defeating and socially defeating and destructive.

One psychotherapist describes the overlapping of irrationality and psychotherapy:  I didn't understand enough about them [patients] or how they thought even to begin to reach them. Listening to their stories, I wanted to offer advice. Why don't you escape from such a relationship? Leave your home, don't submit! Seek out others, expect more for yourself, I wanted to say. But I came to realize that they could not really hear me. They heard my words, perhaps even agreed with my recommendations. They had brain compartments to which new information, my suggestions for example, had easy access. But habits, learned emotional responses, and remembered expectations were buried deep in their brains that dictated the course of their lives. These patients, like victims of encephalitis, could not be awakened.

See also
 Absurdity
 Amygdala hijack
 Behavioral economics
 Bounded rationality
 Cognitive bias
 Dysrationalia
 Irrationalism and Aestheticism
 Logical Fallacy
 Optimism bias
 Rational irrationality
 Rationality and power
 Self-serving bias
 Superstition

Notes

References
 Stuart Sutherland Irrationality: Why We Don't Think Straight, 1992, reissued 2007 by Pinter & Martin 
 
 Lisa Bortolotti, Irrationality, Cambridge, Polity Press, 2014

External links

 Craig R. M. McKenzie. Rational models as theories – not standards – of behavior. Trends in Cognitive Sciences Vol.7 No.9 September 2003
 REBT-CBT NET – Internet Guide to Rational Emotive Behavior Therapy

Reasoning
Concepts in logic
Human behavior
Cognitive biases
Error
Symptoms and signs of mental disorders